Earthworm Jim is an American animated television series based on the video game series of the same name and created by series creator, Doug TenNapel. The series aired on the Kids' WB for two seasons from September 9, 1995, to December 13, 1996. It follows the adventures of the titular character who battles the forces of evil using a robotic suit.

Premise
Most episodes involve the series' numerous villains attempting to reclaim the super suit or conquer the universe. Other issues facing Jim include returning his neighbor's eggbeater and finding a new power source after his suit's battery runs out. Also, the show breaks the fourth wall with characters often talking to the audience and the narrator.

Episodes begin with a cold opening of Earthworm Jim and Peter Puppy in some peril that has nothing to do with the main plot or the past episodes, with little statement of how they got into the mess. In between parts (generally before or after the commercial break), there is a short side-story, generally featuring one of the villains doing a more natural part of life, usually without any involvement from Jim. The end of every episode involves Jim or any other character being crushed by a cow, a homage to the original game's ending.

Characters
Most of the main characters from the show originated from characters introduced in the video game series. Peter Puppy becomes Jim's sidekick and friend and Princess What's-Her-Name is featured as his love interest. Several antagonists from the games such as Evil the Cat, Psy-Crow, Bob the Killer Goldfish, Queen Slug-for-a-Butt, and Professor Monkey-For-A-Head also appear in the series.

Additionally, some original characters were also created for the series, and were then in turn integrated into future games in the series. For example, Evil Jim, an evil doppelgänger of Jim created for the series, went on to be the main antagonist in Earthworm Jim: Menace 2 the Galaxy.

Voice cast
The voice director for the series was Ginny McSwain.

Main
 Dan Castellaneta as Earthworm Jim, Evil Jim, Turns-His-Eyelids-Inside-Out Boy (in "Sidekicked", "Lounge Day's Journey into Night"), Jim's Four Brains, The Grim Reaper (in "The Wizard of Ooze", "For Whom the Jingle Bell Tolls"), Jaepius: God of Puns (in "Assault and Battery"), Abraham Lincoln (in "Sword of Righteousness")
 Jeff Bennett as Peter Puppy, Narrator, The Hamsternator, Evil Peter, Puce Dynamo, President of the United States (in "The Origin of Peter Puppy"," "Peanut of the Apes"), The Great Worm Spirit (in "The Anti-Fish")
 Charlie Adler as Professor Monkey-For-A-Head, The Doorman of The Gods (in "Assault and Battery"), Rudolph the Red-Nosed Reindeer (in "For Whom the Jingle Bell Tolls"), Superhero #1
 Jim Cummings as Psy-Crow, Bob The Killer Goldfish, Johnny Dactyl (in "Assault and Battery"), Walter (in "Conqueror Worm", "Lounge Day's Journey into Night", "The Wizard of Ooze"), Zantor: Master of The Flying Toupée (in "Sidekicked", "Lounge Day's Journey into Night"), The Sword of Righteousness (in "The Sword of Righteousness"), Phlegmaphus: God of Nasal Discharge (in "Assault and Battery"), Lower Back-Pain Man, The Giant Fur-Bearin' Trout (in "The Anti-Fish"), Santa Claus (in "For Whom the Jingle Bell Tolls")
 Edward Hibbert as Evil the Cat
 John Kassir as Snott, Henchrat
 Andrea Martin as Queen Slug-For-A-Butt, The Torch Singer
 Kath Soucie as Princess What's-Her-Name, Evil Princess, Johnny Dactyl's Mom (in "The Exile of Lucy"), Perpsichore: Goddess of Disco (in "Assault and Battery"), Cody (in "Peanut of the Apes")

Additional
 Gregg Berger as Superhero #2
 S. Scott Bullock as various
 Miriam Flynn as Malice the Dog (in "Evil in Love")
 Brad Garrett as The Lord of Nightmares (in "Evil in Love")
 Lisa Kaplan as various
 Danny Mann as Archbug (in "Queen What's-Her-Name", "For Whom the Jingle Bell Tolls")
 Edie McClurg as various
 Dee Dee Rescher as The Purple Alien
 Kevin Michael Richardson as the Anti-Fish (in "Anti-Fish")
 Roger Rose as various
 Ben Stein as Rosebud the Nameless Beast (in "The Great Secret of the Universe"), Dr. Houston (in "The Origin of Peter Puppy")
 Billy West as The Sturgeon (in "Lounge Day's Journey into Night"), Morty (in "Lounge Day's Journey into Night")
 April Winchell as Mrs. Bleverage, Ilene (in "Lounge Day's Journey into Night")

Production
The series was created by Doug TenNapel and produced by Universal Cartoon Studios along with AKOM, Flextech Television Limited, and Shiny Entertainment.

Episodes
Two seasons of the series were produced, for a total of 23 episodes.

Series overview

Season 1 (1995–1996)

Season 2 (1996)

Broadcast history
In the United States, the show was aired on Kids' WB on The WB Television Network from 1995 to 1996. Internationally, in the United Kingdom, it was shown on Channel 4 and TCC (The Children's Channel) in the 1990s. In the 2000s, the show has seen occasional reruns on Nickelodeon. In Ireland, the show was aired on RTÉ Two from 12 September 1996 to 1997. In Canada, the show was aired on YTV. In Mexico, the show was aired on TV Azteca. In Germany, the show was aired on RTL. In the Netherlands, the show was aired on Kindernet. In Poland, the show was aired on RTL 7.

Media
The show was released in the UK onto three VHS tapes in three volumes covering two episodes on each video in the 1990s but these are now out of print and considered rare.

On June 1, 2011, Via Vision Entertainment released the complete series as a 5-disc set in Australia and New Zealand.

The set includes all 23 episodes on 3 discs, and is currently available on Amazon.com.

Digitally, the complete series is currently available on Fox Corporation's Tubi.

Legacy
Aspects of the show, such as newly created characters, or art style, were later implemented in future video games Earthworm Jim 3D and Earthworm Jim: Menace 2 the Galaxy. Two Earthworm Jim comic book series, in the US and UK, were also created to tie into the animated series.

A line of action figures based on the show was released by Playmates Toys. The series included several variants of Earthworm Jim, as well as Peter Puppy, Princess What's-Her-Name, Bob the Killer Goldfish, #4, Evil the Cat, Henchrat, Major Mucus and Psy-Crow. A mountable "pocket rocket" was also available as well as a rare mail-in repainted figure of Earthworm Jim in a green suit.

On November 18, 2021, it was reported that a new animated television series titled Earthworm Jim: Beyond the Groovy is in development.

References

External links
 
 Earthworm Jim at Don Markstein's Toonopedia. Archived from the original on June 4, 2016.

1995 American television series debuts
1996 American television series endings
1990s American animated television series
1990s American comic science fiction television series
American children's animated action television series
American children's animated adventure television series
American children's animated comic science fiction television series
American children's animated science fantasy television series
American children's animated superhero television series
Animated series based on video games
Earthworm Jim
Kids' WB original shows
Television series by Universal Animation Studios
Television series created by Doug TenNapel
Universal Pictures cartoons and characters